Zahi is a given name. Notable people with the name include:

Zahi Armeli (born 1957), Israeli football player
Zahi El-Khoury (born 1969), Lebanese fencer
Zahi Hawass (born 1947), Egyptian archaeologist 
Zahi Hawass bibliography, list of all books and other works written, co-written, and/or edited by Zahi Hawass